Jean Degottex (born in Sathonay-Camp on February 25, 1918, died in Paris on December 9, 1988) was a French abstract painter, known in particular for his initial proximity with the lyrical abstraction movement of the 1950s and 1960s. He is considered an important artist of the abstraction movement in the second half of the twentieth century and a significant inspiration for contemporary art. Degottex was particularly inspired by East Asian calligraphy and Zen philosophy in achieving the erasure of the creative subject.

Life and art
Jean Degottex was born in Sathonay-Camp and spent his childhood in Lyon. Coming from a modest background, he was almost self-taught. At the age of fifteen, he moved to Paris with his parents, quit school and began to earn his living. In Paris, he made contact with the libertarian circles of the 1930s, and occasionally practiced drawing in the academies of Montparnasse. He served in the military in Tunisia and Algeria from 1939 to 1941, years during which he painted his first figurative paintings, under the influence of Fauvism.

He then decided to devote himself entirely to painting. From 1941, he took part in the "Salon for those under thirty" (Salon des moins de trente ans). From 1948 his art became abstract and was closer to lyrical abstraction. In 1949, he had his first exhibition, at the Denise René Gallery, which was associated with avant-garde abstract artists, and at the Beaune Gallery. That year he met Renée Beslon, poet, visual artist and art critic, who would remain his companion until his death.

in 1951 Degottex was awarded the Prix Kandinsky. From 1954, his style moved towards a gestural abstraction, favoring the freedom and speed of execution.

In 1953, he exhibited at the L'Étoile scellée gallery, whose artistic director was André Breton. Breton saw in Degottex's latest works (Feu noir 12–1955, Ascendant 12–1955) a possible pictorial illustration of the principle of "automatic writing", which characterized the works of the surrealist artists. Degottex pointed out to him his spontaneous affinity with Chinese and Japanese writings, and especially with the philosophy and practices of Zen.

The period from 1956 to 1963 was particularly fruitful in Degottex's career. It is also the best known to the public. During those years, he painted large-scale works, often in series with the same idea used repeatedly: suite Ashkenazi (1957), suite Serto (March–April, November 1957), suite des Hagakure (November 1957), les 18 Vides (1959), suite des Roses (1960), suite des Alliances (1960), les 7 Metasignes (1961), and Jshet (1962).

During this time he experienced tragedy when his daughter, Frédérique, died in an accident at the age of 16. After a year of mourning, Degottex resumed his series: Écritures, with the following works: the suites Rose-Noire (August 1964), Suite Obscure (November–December 1964), Metasphère (1966), ETC (December 1964 / March 1967) and Horsphères (1967). From 1966 until his death, he produced a wider collection of work in Gordes, in the Vaucluse region, where from the early 1970s, he lived in summers with Beslon.

From 1972 to 1976, he held several solo exhibitions at the Galerie Germain. In particular, he exhibited the Médias series. The works in the series usually contain two areas of separated color: a plain surface in matte black acrylic and a lower part in Chinese ink wash.

He worked more and more with paper material: the tearing technique, for example, revealing this texture (seriés d’ARR rouges, puis blancs). The Germain Gallery also exhibited his Papiers Pleins (1974-1975), papers glued and peeled in horizontal stripes, and his Papiers pleins Obliques (1976) with incisions raised by diagonals. With the work Papiers-Report (1977), he began to explore a new technique that involved "reporter" by folding half of the paper surface onto the other. He used this imprint technique on all sorts of materials, including large acrylic canvases, like in the séries des Lignes-Report (1978) and the Plis-Report (1978). In 1979 he created specifically for a solo exhibition at the Abbaye de Sénaque at Gordes, a series of paintings referred to as Déplis.

In 1981 he was awarded the Grand National Prize of Painting (Grand Prix National de la Peinture). In 1982, he joined the Gallery of France and created the series of the Grilles-Collors, the Oblicollors, and the Diacollors. His last major works were the Lignes-Bois (1985) and the Contre-Lignes Bois (1986), in white, grey, or blue grey.

Jean Degottex died in Paris on December 9, 1988.

Exhibitions

Solo exhibitions
 Galerie de Beaune, Paris, 1950
 Galerie à l’Étoile Scellée, textes by André Breton and Charles Estienne, Paris, 1955
 Galerie Kléber, textes by Renée Beslon, Paris, 1956 and 1958
 Les Dix-huit vides, Galerie internationale d'art contemporain, Paris, 1959
 Les Alliances, Hélios Art, Bruxelles ; galerie San Stephan, Vienne, 1960
 Sept Métasignes sur la Fleur, Palais des beaux-arts, Bruxelles, 1961
 Horsphères, Galerie Jean Fournier, Texte by Alain Jouffroy, Paris, 1967
 Les déchirures, Galerie Germain, Paris, 1972
 Suite, Mèdias, Galerie Germain, Paris, 1976 and 1978
 Musée de Grenoble, 1978
 Degottex. Toiles, papiers, graphiques, 1962-1978, musée d'Art moderne de la ville de Paris, texte by Bernard Lamarche-Vadel, 1978
 Abbaye de Sénanque, Gordes, Vaucluse, 1979
 Degottex. Notes de parcours, Galerie de France, Paris, 1983 and 1985
 Repères 1955-1985, Galerie de France, Paris 1988
 Musée d’Évreux et Musée de Brou, Bourg-en Bresse, 1988

Exhibitions after death
 Degottex. Reports 77-81, texte by Pierre Buraglio, Galerie de France, Paris, 1990
 Signes et Métasignes, texte by Renée Beslon, Carré d'Art, Nîmes, 1992
 Papiers-Reports, Galerie Sablon, Paris, 1993
 Médias, texte de Geneviève Breerette, Galerie Rabouan-Moussion, Paris, 1996
 Degottex, Espace Fortant Sète, 1997
 Reports, texte by Maurice Benhamou, Galerie Regard, Paris 1997
 La révolution continue, Frac Bourgogne, Dijon, 2000
 Œuvres 78-83, textes by Hubert Besacier and Maurice Benhamou, Maison de la culture de Bourges, 2003
 Degottex 73-86, textes by Hubert Basacier et Maurice Benhamou, Carré Saint Vincent, Orléans, 2005
 Degottex, 58-85, texte by Pierre Wat, Art Paris, Galerie l'Or du Temps, 2007
 Jean Degottex, textes by M. Benhamou, B. Heidsieck, R. Mabin, Pierre Wat, directed by A. Cariou, musée des beaux-arts de Quimper, 2008
 Musée du monastère royal de Brou, Bourg-en-Bresse, 2009
 Musée des beaux-arts, Évreux, 2009
 Galerie Pascal Lainé, présentation Dominique Bollinger, Ménerbes, Vaucluse, 2011
 Galerie Bernard Bouche, Paris, 2013
 Vide-matière, Galerie Jacques Lévy, Paris, 2013
 Jean Degottex, du signe à l'écriture, de l'écriture à la ligne, texte by Pierre Wat, galerie Berthet-Aittouares, Paris, 2013
 Frac Bourgogne, Dijon, 2014
 Galerie Berthet-Aittouares, Paris, 2015

Group exhibitions
 Sept peintres, Galerie Denise René, Paris, 1949
 Peintres de la Nouvelle École de Paris, Galerie de Babylone, Paris, 1952
 La Coupe et l'Épée, galerie L'étoile Scellée, Paris, 1953
 Alice in Wonderland, Galerie Kléber, Paris, 1956
 Tensions - Jean Degottex, Simon Hantaï, Judit Reigl, Claude Viseux, Galerie René Drouin, 1956
 Documenta II, Cassel, Allemagne, 1959
 XXXIIe Venise Biennale, Italy, 1964
 L’écriture du peintre : Degottex, Georges, Giacometti, Hantaï, Hartung, Mathieu, Michaux, Sonderborg, Tobey, textes by Geneviève Bonnefoi, Galerie Jean Fournier, 1964
 Douze ans D'art contemporain en France, Grand Palais, Paris, 1972
 Abstraction Analytique, musée d'Art moderne de la ville de Paris, 1978
 Lenguajes del papel. Geneviève Asse, Jean Degottex, Henri Michaux, Buenos Aires, Museo Nacional de Bellas Artes, 1987

Exhibitions after death
 La peinture après l'Abstraction.1955-1975. Martin Barré, Jean Degottex, Raymond Hains, Simon Hantaï, Jacques Villeglé, textes by Suzanne Pagé, musée d'Art moderne de la ville de Paris, 1998
 Rendez-vous, Guggenheim museum and Centre Georges-Pompidou, New York and Paris, 1998
 Kunst-svelten im Dialog, Ludwig museom, Köln, 2000
 Encre / Chine - T'ang Haywen, Gao Xingjian, Jean Degottex, Hong Kong University Museum and Art Gallery, mai-juin 2005
 Les Sujets de l'Abstraction, Fondation Gandur, musée Rath, Genève, 2011 et musée Fabre, Montpellier, 2012
 Phares, Centre Pompidou-Metz, 2014-2016

Awards
 1951: 
 1981: National Grand Prize for Painting

Public collections
 France
 Bourg-en-Bresse, musée de Brou
 Brest, musée des beaux-arts
 Rennes, Frac Bretagne
 Dijon, Musée des beaux-arts
 Évreux, Musée d'Évreux
 Colmar, Musée Unterlinden
 Grenoble, Musée de Grenoble
 Marseille, Musée Cantini
 Nantes, Musée des beaux-arts
 Paris
 Bibliothèque nationale de France
 Centre national d'art et de culture Georges-Pompidou
 Fonds national d'art contemporain
 Musée d'art moderne de la ville de Paris
 Saint-Paul-de-Vence, Fondation Maeght
 Toulon, Musée d'art de Toulon
 Austria
 Vienna, Museum of Modern Art
 Belgium
 Bruxelles, Royal Museums of Fine Arts of Belgium
 Liège, musée des beaux-arts
 United States
 Minneapolis Institute of Arts
 New York, Solomon R. Guggenheim Museum
 Israel
 Jerusalem, Israel Museum
 Japan
 Osaka, Gutai Gallery
 Kurashiki, Ōhara Museum of Art 
 Netherlands
 Amsterdam, Peter Stuyvesant collection 
 Sweden
 Malmö, Konsthall

References

1918 births
1988 deaths
French male painters
20th-century painters
Art Informel and Tachisme painters